The 1857 Atlantic hurricane season was the earliest season documented by HURDAT – the official Atlantic hurricane database – to feature no major hurricanes. A total of four tropical cyclones were observed during the season, three of which strengthened into hurricanes. However, in the absence of modern satellite and other remote-sensing technologies, only storms that affected populated land areas or encountered ships at sea are known, so the actual total could be higher. An undercount bias of zero to six tropical cyclones per year between 1851 and 1885 has been estimated. Additionally, documentation by Jose Fernandez-Partagas and Henry Diaz included a fifth tropical cyclone near Port Isabel, Texas; this storm has since been removed from HURDAT as it was likely the same system as the fourth tropical cyclone.

The first storm was tracked beginning on June 30 offshore North Carolina. It moved eastward and was last noted on the following day. However, no tropical cyclones were reported in the remainder of July or August. Activity resumed when another tropical storm was located southeast of the Bahamas on September 6. It intensified into a hurricane before making landfall in North Carolina and was last noted over the north Atlantic Ocean on September 17. The SS Central America sank offshore, drowning 424 passengers and crew members. Another hurricane may have existed east of South Carolina between September 22 and October 26, though little information is available. The final documented tropical cyclone was initially observed east of Lesser Antilles on September 24. It traversed the Caribbean Sea and the Gulf of Mexico, striking the Yucatán Peninsula and later Port Isabel, Texas. The storm dissipated on September 30. In Texas, damage was reported in several towns near the mouth of the Rio Grande River.

The season's activity was reflected with a low accumulated cyclone energy (ACE) rating of 43. ACE is, broadly speaking, a measure of the power of the hurricane multiplied by the length of time it existed, so storms that last a long time, as well as particularly strong hurricanes, have high ACEs. It is only calculated at six-hour increments in which tropical and subtropical systems are either at or above sustained wind speeds of 39 mph (63 km/h), which is the threshold for tropical storm intensity.


Timeline

Systems

Tropical Storm One

The ship Star of the South experienced heavy gales offshore the East Coast of the United States on June 30. The storm moved slightly north of due east with winds of 60 mph (95 km/h). It was last noted about 265 miles (425 km) north-northwest of Bermuda by the bark Virginia late on July 1.

Hurricane Two

The S.S. Central America Disaster Hurricane of 1857 

A tropical storm was first observed east of the Bahamas on September 6. It moved slowly northwestward towards the coast of the United States and attained hurricane strength early on September 9. The cyclone continued travelling northwest along the US coast, becoming a Category 2 hurricane whilst off the coast of Georgia on September 11. On September 13 the cyclone made landfall near Wilmington, North Carolina, but then quickly weakened to a tropical storm and turned eastward into the Atlantic on September 14. Throughout September 15, whilst over water, the storm regained hurricane strength and continued northward before becoming extratropical in the mid-Atlantic on September 17.

The hurricane caused much coastal damage particularly in the Cape Hatteras area during September 9 and September 10 and then to other parts of the North Carolina coast. Flooding was reported at New Bern. Considerable wind damage also occurred. An article from the Wilmington Journal reported that, "It looked as though everything that could be blown down, was down. Fences were prostrated in all directions, and the streets filled with the limbs and bodies of trees up-rooted or twisted off.". Several ships were caught in rough seas of the East Coast of the United States. The Norfolk was abandoned in pieces ten miles south of Chincoteague early on the morning of September 14. Further south, on September 11, the hurricane struck the steamer Central America which sprung a leak and eventually sank on the night of September 12 with the loss of 424 passengers and crew. Also on board the ship were 30,000 pounds of gold, the loss of which contributed to the financial Panic of 1857.

Hurricane Three

Based on reports bark Aeronaut and the schooner Alabama indicating a severe gale, Partagas and Diaz identified a Category 1 hurricane about 405 miles (650 km) east of Charleston, South Carolina between September 22 and September 26. Sustained wind speeds of 80 mph (130 km/h) were observed. No evidence was found for a storm track so the hurricane was assigned a stationary position, at latitude 32.5°N, 3.5°W. Among the ships which encountered the hurricane was the brig Jerome Knight, which sprung a leak and sunk on the night of September 22.

Hurricane Four

Initially a tropical storm, it strengthened slightly before crossing the Leeward Islands on September 25. In Guadeloupe, several ships at the port in Basseterre were swept out to sea. Continuing eastward, the storm soon entered the Caribbean Sea. Early on September 26, the system strengthened into a hurricane. By September 28, it was west of the Cayman Islands and had reached Category 2 strength. The storm weakened to a tropical storm after passing Cancún early on September 29 and impacted the Gulf coastline, near the United States–Mexico border, at that strength the next day before dissipating. At Port Isabel, Texas, several hundred homes were swept away, and several towns near the mouth of the Rio Grande also sustained damage.

See also

 List of tropical cyclones
 Atlantic hurricane season

Notes

References

 
Atlantic hurricane seasons
Articles which contain graphical timelines
Hurricanes
1857 meteorology